Michael Tumilty (born 12 April 1971 in Hartlepool) is a Scottish former football referee, who officiated in the Scottish Premier League. English born Tumilty became a referee in November 1987 and achieved Category I status in 2003.

Tumilty was in charge on 1 November 2009, for the match between Dundee United and Rangers, which was abandoned at half-time due to heavy rain. It was only the third Scottish Premier League game to have been halted since the league's formation.

References

External links
Mike Tumilty profile at Scottishfa.co.uk

1971 births
Living people
Scottish football referees
Sportspeople from Hartlepool
Scottish Football League referees
Scottish Premier League referees